Chillin' may refer to:

"Chillin" (Wale song), a 2009 song by rapper Wale featuring singer Lady Gaga
"Chillin'" (Tego Calderón song), a 2006 song by Tego Calderon featuring Don Omar
"Chillin'" (Modjo song), a 2000 song by Modjo
"Chillin'", a 2010 song by Blaine Larsen
Chillin' (David "Fathead" Newman album), 1999
Chillin' (Force MDs album), 1985
 Gregg Chillin (born 1988), English actor